The Federal Administrative Court is one of the five federal supreme courts of Germany. It is the court of the last resort for generally all cases of administrative law, mainly disputes between citizens and the state. It hears appeals from the  Oberverwaltungsgerichte, or Superior Administrative Courts, which, in turn, are the courts of appeals for decisions of the Verwaltungsgerichte (administrative courts).

However, cases concerning social security law belong to the jurisdiction of the Sozialgerichte (Social Courts) with the  Bundessozialgericht as federal court of appeals, and cases of tax and customs law are decided by the Finanzgerichte (Fiscal Courts), and, ultimately, by the Bundesfinanzhof.

The Bundesverwaltungsgericht has its seat at the former Reichsgericht (Imperial Court of Justice) building in Leipzig's district Mitte.

Previous judges
Everhardt Franßen, 1991–2002

External links

Official homepage

Germany
Administrative courts
Courts in Germany
Leipzig
1952 establishments in West Germany
Courts and tribunals established in 1952